3rd Aurel Awards

Producer Forza 

Broadcaster Markíza 

Lifetime Achievement František Krištof Veselý

◄ 2nd │ 4th ►

The 3rd Aurel Awards, honoring the best in the Slovak music industry for individual achievements for the year of 2003, took time and place on March 5, 2004 at the Istropolis in Bratislava.

Winners

Main categories

Others

References

External links
 Academy of Popular Music (APH) > Members (at IFPI.sk)
 Aurel Awards > 2003 Nominees (at IFPI.sk)
 Aurel Awards > 2003 Winners (at IFPI.sk)

3
Aurel Awards
2004 music awards